"Please Smile Again" is Namie Amuro's 17th solo single on the Avex Trax label. Although the single "Think of Me / No More Tears" (2001) was slated to be released in December, it was pushed back until the next year making "Please Smile Again" the last single to precede her 4th studio album, Break the Rules (2000). It was certified gold for 200,000 copies shipped to stores.

Commercial tie-in
"Please Smile Again" was used in commercials for Meiji Fran products. "Cross Over" was used in cell phone MM TU-KA commercials. Amuro appeared in both ad campaigns.

Track listing
 "Please Smile Again (TK original mix)" (Tetsuya Komuro) – 4:46
 "Cross Over (TK original mix)" (Tetsuya Komuro) – 4:43
 "Please Smile Again (Jamaster A Mix)" (Remixed by Alex Baboo & Groovy Cat) – 6:37
 "Please Smile Again (TV mix)" (Tetsuya Komuro) – 4:45
 "Please Smile Again (a cappella)" (Tetsuya Komuro) – 4:35

Personnel
 Namie Amuro – vocals, background vocals
 Tetsuya Komuro – synthesizer, keyboard
 Ken Kimura – guitar

Production
 Producer – Tetsuya Komuro
 Arranger – Tetsuya Komuro
 Mixing – Tetsuya Komuro
 Remixing & additional production – Alex Baboo & Groovy Cat
 Synthesizer programming – Akihisa Murakami, Toshihide Iwasa

Charts
Oricon Sales Chart (Japan)

References 

2000 singles
Namie Amuro songs
Songs written by Tetsuya Komuro
2000 songs
Avex Trax singles